Giannis Nakos (born 23 February 1993) is a Greek professional footballer who plays for Asteras Parapotamou, in the Gamma Ethniki, as striker.

Career

PAS Giannina 
Born in Ioannina, Nakos began playing football with PAS Giannina. On 26  May 2013, he made his professional debut for PAS Giannina in a  match against PAOK fon the second game of playoffs. In July 2015 released from PAS Giannina.

Thesprotos Igoumenitsa 
On summer 2015 he signed on Thesprotos. He had 36 appearances and 6 goals in Gamma Ethniki.

Asteras Parapotamou 
On summer 2017 he signed on Asteras Parapotamou.

Doxa Kranoulas 
In January 2018 he signed on Doxa Kranoulas.

References

External links

Superleaguegreece.net

1993 births
Living people
Greek footballers
Association football defenders
Super League Greece players
PAS Giannina F.C. players
Footballers from Ioannina